This article lists the diplomatic missions of Transnistria. Transnistria is a state with limited recognition, that broke away from Moldova after the War of Transnistria in 1992. Transnistria did not receive recognition from any UN member states. It has been recognized as an independent state by Abkhazia, Nagorno-Karabakh and South Ossetia only. At present, Transnistria has three representative offices abroad.

Europe
 
 Sukhumi (Representative office)

 Moscow (Official Diplomatic Bureau)
 
 Tskhinvali (Representative office)

See also 
Foreign relations of Transnistria
List of diplomatic missions in Transnistria

References

External links 
 Ministry of Foreign Affairs of Pridnestrovian Moldavian Republic

Diplomatic missions of
Transnistria
Diplomatic missions of Transnistria